Paniko Gham is a Nepalese novel by Amar Neupane. It was published in 2009 (2066 BS) by Pairavi Prakashan. It is the debut novel of the author.

Synopsis 
The novel consists of many stories set in Nepalgunj city in Mid-western region of Nepal. Neupane was posted as a teacher in Nepalgunj and there he decided to write the book. The stories represent the socio-economic lifestyle of the people of the city.

Reception 
The book received the Padmashree Sahitya Puraskar for the year 2066 BS (2009).

See also 

 Seto Dharti
 Karodaun Kasturi
 Loo

References 

21st-century Nepalese novels
Nepalese novels
Padmashree Sahitya Puraskar-winning works
2009 Nepalese novels
Novels set in Nepal
Nepali-language novels
Novels set in Nepalgunj